Rami Hamdallah (born 10 August 1958) is a Palestinian politician and academic. He served as prime minister of the Palestinian National Authority from 2014 to 2019 and president of An-Najah National University in Nablus.

On 2 June 2013, the Palestinian president Mahmoud Abbas named him to succeed Salam Fayyad as prime minister. His appointment was not recognized by Hamas, who were not consulted in the decision. He is a member of Fatah; however, the BBC states that he is a political independent. On 20 June 2013, Hamdallah tendered his resignation, which Abbas accepted on 23 June. Six weeks after that, Abbas asked Hamdallah to form a new government, which he did on 19 September 2013. He was appointed the head of the unity government on 2 June 2014, a position from which he resigned on 29 January 2019.

Early life and education
Rami Hamdallah was born in Anabta in the northern Palestine on 10 August 1958. He graduated from the University of Jordan in 1980 and received his MA from the University of Manchester in 1982. Hamdallah completed a PhD in linguistics at Lancaster University in 1988.

Career
Hamdallah, widely known as Abū Wālid ('Father of Walid', after one of his deceased children) is a professor at An-Najah National University. He was hired in 1982 as English instructor, and at the University he got to know his future wife. He was appointed president of the university in 1998. During his 15 years' term, he tripled the student enrollment, which now numbers 20,000 students on 4 campuses. He also opened a 400-bed teaching hospital. He served as the secretary general of Palestinian Central Elections Commission from 2002 to 2013. He was the commission's deputy chairman in 2011. He was sworn in as prime minister on 6 June 2013 and replaced Salam Fayyad in the post. Only two weeks into the job, however, Hamdallah tendered his resignation, reportedly as result of interference with Hamdallah's authority by Abbas' aides. On 23 June 2013, Abbas accepted Hamdallah's resignation, but appointed him as the head of the interim government. Hamdallah's resignation was praised by Mohammed Dajani, the founder of the Wastia Movement of Moderate Islam in the West Bank, who stated that "I respect him for taking this decision. They thought he would be window dressing and he would not accept that."

Six weeks after Hamdallah's resignation, Abbas asked him to form a new government, which he did on 19 September 2013.

On 13 March 2018, Hamdallah survived an assassination attempt during his visit to the Gaza Strip.

On 29 January 2019 he and his government handed their resignation to President Abbas, who accepted the request on the following day. But was replaced by Mohammad Shtayyeh in April 2019.

Personal life
Three of his children, 11-year-old twins and a 9-year-old boy, were killed in a car accident in 2000. He and his wife had another daughter afterwards.

References

1958 births
Living people
People from Anabta
Fatah members
Prime Ministers of Palestine
Linguists
Academic staff of An-Najah National University
Alumni of Lancaster University
Alumni of Graduate College, Lancaster
University of Jordan alumni
Alumni of the University of Manchester